William D Watson (1930 – 2018) was an English bow maker. The last pupil of William Retford, William Watson worked for the firm of W.E. Hill & Sons from 1945 to 1962. He continued to make exemplary bows after leaving the firm and built a reputation as an authority on the history of British bow making. His bows for Hill are stamped with the number 7. He lived in Falmouth, Cornwall.

References
Profile at Hill Bows
Bows and Bowmakers - W.C. Retford  1964 
W.E. Hill & Sons (A Tribute)- Richard Sadler 1996 
 

1930 births
Bow makers
British luthiers
People from Falmouth, Cornwall
Year of death missing